The Erlun Sports Park is a park in Erlun Township, Yunlin County, Taiwan.

See also
 List of parks in Taiwan

References

Parks in Taiwan
Tourist attractions in Yunlin County